AMSS may stand for:

Metropolitan Area of San Salvador (Área Metropolitana de San Salvador)
Amarchand & Mangaldas & Suresh A Shroff & Co, an Indian law firm
Amplitude modulation signalling system, a digital system for adding information to AM broadcast signals
Ainsworth's Maternal Sensitivity Scale, a measure of maternal sensitivity
Aeronautical mobile-satellite service
Auto-Moto Association of Serbia, an FIA member organisation